São Martinho de Árvore (also known simply as Árvore) is a former civil parish in the municipality of Coimbra, Portugal. The population in 2011 was 1,033, in an area of 3.26 km2. On 28 January 2013 it merged with Lamarosa to form São Martinho de Árvore e Lamarosa.

It was previously part of the then-municipality Tentúgal. It was disbanded on 31 December 1853 and became part of the municipality of Coimbra.

References 

Former parishes of Coimbra